Iwase-ike  is an earthfill dam located in Kagawa Prefecture in Japan. The dam is used for irrigation. The dam impounds about 24  ha of land when full and can store 1016 thousand cubic meters of water. The construction of the dam was  completed in 1967.

See also
List of dams in Japan

References

Dams in Kagawa Prefecture